The Women's team recurve open was one of the events held in archery at the 2008 Summer Paralympics in Beijing. Teams consisted of three archers who had competed in either the Standing or W1/W2 individual events. Team ranking was based on the aggregate individual ranking scores: in the knockout matches each team shot 24 arrows.

Results

The event was won by the team representing .

Ranking Round

Competition bracket

References

W
2008 in women's archery